Mughatil ibn Atieh Bakri (مقاتل بن عطیه بکری) was allegedly a Medieval authority of the Al-Nizamiyya of Baghdad, and son in law of Nizam al-Mulk. He is known only by a treatise that he wrote, in which he recounts in detail a Sunni - Shia debate taking place in the court of Sultan Malik Shah I.

The text was written in Arabic under the title "مؤتمر علماء بغداد" and has been translated into Persian under the title In search of Truth in Baghdad (در جستجوی حق در بغداد).

See also
Islamic scholars
History of Iraq
History of Iran

References

External links
Debate account (in Arabic) 

Year of birth unknown
Year of death unknown
11th-century Muslim scholars of Islam